Renato De Sanzuane (March 5, 1925 – June 23, 1986) was an Italian water polo player who competed in the 1952 Summer Olympics.

He was born in Venice and died in Mestre.

In 1952 he was part of the Italian team which won the bronze medal in the Olympic tournament. He played seven matches.

See also
 List of Olympic medalists in water polo (men)

External links
 

1925 births
1986 deaths
Italian male water polo players
Water polo players at the 1952 Summer Olympics
Olympic bronze medalists for Italy in water polo
Medalists at the 1952 Summer Olympics
Sportspeople from Venice